Miroslava Jaškovská, also known as Miroslava Pospíšilová-Jaškovská, (born 5 March 1955 in Čeladná) is a former Czechoslovakian cross-country skier who competed during the 1970s. She won a bronze medal in the 4 × 5 km relay at the 1974 FIS Nordic World Ski Championships in Falun.

Her best olympic placing was 23rd in the 5 km event at the 1976 Winter Olympics in Innsbruck.

Cross-country skiing results

Olympic Games

World Championships
 1 medal – (1 bronze)

External links
World Championship results 

1955 births
Czech female cross-country skiers
Living people
Olympic cross-country skiers of Czechoslovakia
Cross-country skiers at the 1976 Winter Olympics
FIS Nordic World Ski Championships medalists in cross-country skiing
Czechoslovak female cross-country skiers
People from Frýdek-Místek District
Sportspeople from the Moravian-Silesian Region